Union is a village in Cass County, Nebraska, United States. The population was 233 at the 2010 census.

History
Union was laid out in 1890 at a railroad junction. Sources differ whether the town was named for patriotic reasons after the federal union, or from its location at the railroad junction, a "union" of rails.

Geography
Union is located at  (40.813763, -95.922336).

Demographics

2010 census
As of the census of 2010, there were 233 people, 91 households, and 64 families living in the village. The racial makeup of the village was 96.6% White, 0.4% Native American, 0.4% Asian, 1.3% from other races, and 1.3% from two or more races. Hispanic or Latino of any race were 4.7% of the population.

There were 91 households, of which 34.1% had children under the age of 18 living with them, 57.1% were married couples living together, 4.4% had a female householder with no husband present, 8.8% had a male householder with no wife present, and 29.7% were non-families. 20.9% of all households were made up of individuals, and 7.7% had someone living alone who was 65 years of age or older. The average household size was 2.56 and the average family size was 3.00.

The median age in the village was 36.1 years. 26.6% of residents were under the age of 18; 6.5% were between the ages of 18 and 24; 26.5% were from 25 to 44; 30.1% were from 45 to 64; and 10.3% were 65 years of age or older. The gender makeup of the village was 55.4% male and 44.6% female.

2000 census
As of the census of 2000, there were 260 people, 102 households, and 78 families living in the village. The population density was 1,252.8 people per square mile (478.0/km2). There were 112 housing units at an average density of 539.7 per square mile (205.9/km2). The racial makeup of the village was 97.31% White, 0.38% Native American, 0.77% Asian, and 1.54% from two or more races. Hispanic or Latino of any race were 1.15% of the population.

There were 102 households, out of which 35.3% had children under the age of 18 living with them, 67.6% were married couples living together, 4.9% had a female householder with no husband present, and 23.5% were non-families. 21.6% of all households were made up of individuals, and 11.8% had someone living alone who was 65 years of age or older. The average household size was 2.55 and the average family size was 2.94.

In the village, the population was spread out, with 27.3% under the age of 18, 9.6% from 18 to 24, 32.7% from 25 to 44, 20.8% from 45 to 64, and 9.6% who were 65 years of age or older. The median age was 37 years. For every 100 females, there were 106.3 males. For every 100 females age 18 and over, there were 103.2 males.

As of 2000 the median income for a household in the village was $35,000, and the median income for a family was $39,375. Males had a median income of $32,500 versus $20,000 for females. The per capita income for the village was $14,839. About 7.0% of families and 5.2% of the population were below the poverty line, including 6.6% of those under the age of eighteen and 8.0% of those 65 or over.

Notable persons
Harry Smith, baseball player
David Lechner, CFO of the University of Nebraska (Lincoln) and University of South Florida
Helen Crunk, Chairwoman of the National Center for Assisted Living

References

Villages in Nebraska
Villages in Cass County, Nebraska